Ouyang Xiaofang (Simplified Chinese: 欧阳晓芳; born 5 April 1983) is a weightlifter from Liaoning, People's Republic of China.

Ouyang participated in the women's -63 kg class at the 2006 World Weightlifting Championships and won the gold medal, snatching 110 kg and clean and jerking an additional 136 kg for a total of 246 kg.

At the 2006 Asian Games, she suffered a knee injury, but won the silver medal in the 63 kg category.

Achievements
 2006 World Weightlifting Championships, -63 kg

References

Living people
1983 births
World Weightlifting Championships medalists
Weightlifters from Liaoning
Place of birth missing (living people)
Asian Games medalists in weightlifting
Weightlifters at the 2006 Asian Games
Chinese female weightlifters

Female powerlifters
People from Chaoyang, Liaoning
Asian Games silver medalists for China
Medalists at the 2006 Asian Games
20th-century Chinese women
21st-century Chinese women